Soft tennis at the 2011 Southeast Asian Games was held at Jakabaring Sport Complex, Palembang, Indonesia.

Medalists

Medal table

External links
  2011 Southeast Asian Games

2011 Southeast Asian Games events
2011 soft tennis
Southeast Asian Games soft